Club Deportivo Oberena is a sports club based in Pamplona, in the autonomous community of Navarre, better known by its football section. Founded in 1940, it plays its home games at Estadio Oberena, with a capacity of 2,500 seats.

Season to season

42 seasons in Tercera División

Famous players
 Xavier Asurmendi
 Pablo Lusarreta
 Txiki
 Ignacio Zoco

External links
Official website 
Futbolme team profile 
Scottish Supporters Club

Football clubs in Navarre
Sport in Pamplona
Association football clubs established in 1940
1940 establishments in Spain
Multi-sport clubs in Spain